The Justin Matthews Jr. House is a historic house at 257 Skyline Drive in North Little Rock, Arkansas.  It is a large two story Mediterranean Revival house, designed by Little Rock architect Max F. Meyer and built in 1928.  It has all of the hallmarks of this style, including a red tile roof, stuccoed walls, arched openings for doors and windows, and wrought iron grillwork.  The house was built for the son of developer Justin Matthews in his Park Hill development.

The house was listed on the National Register of Historic Places in 1990.

See also
National Register of Historic Places listings in Pulaski County, Arkansas

References

Houses on the National Register of Historic Places in Arkansas
Mission Revival architecture in Arkansas
Houses completed in 1928
Houses in North Little Rock, Arkansas
National Register of Historic Places in Pulaski County, Arkansas